Pulgarcito (in Spanish, literally "little thumb") may refer to:
Pulgarcito, the Spanish variant of the folktale Tom Thumb
Pulgarcito (Mexico), a children's magazine of the Mexican government, 1925–1932
Pulgarcito (Spain), a Spanish weekly illustrated magazine, 1921–1987
Cesáreo Quezadas (born 1950), Mexican actor
Manuel Ramos (boxer) (1942–1999), Mexican boxer